Sarah Emily Ramos (born May 21, 1991) is an American actress who began her career as a child actress. She is known for her roles on the television series American Dreams (2002–2005) and Parenthood (2010–2015).

Early life
Ramos was born in Los Angeles, California. Her father is of one quarter Filipino ancestry. Her mother is Jewish. She became interested in acting at a young age. Ramos began developing her acting abilities at the age of nine, entering into formal training at Center Stage L.A. "According to her mother, 11-year-old Sarah Ramos would go to bed each night pleading to get an agent — then wake up each morning asking about the status of her parents' talent agent search." She graduated from Columbia University in May 2015.

Career
Ramos began her acting career as a child in various television commercials. She gained attention as Patty Pryor in the NBC drama TV series American Dreams (2002–2005). This role garnered her acting accolades, including winning the Women's Image Network Award (WIN) for Best Actress in a TV Drama in 2003 and various nominations by the Young Artist Awards. Variety commented: "Patty is an out-and-out brat, and Ramos does it right."

In April 2006, she landed the role of Hannah Rader a.k.a. Kate Holland on the CW series Runaway. However, the show was canceled after one season. Ramos's other television credits include guest-starring roles in Scrubs, Close to Home, Ghost Whisperer, Law & Order, Wizards of Waverly Place, Without a Trace, Private Practice, and Lie to Me.

In 2009, she was cast as Haddie Braverman in the NBC series Parenthood. Parenthood'''s fourth season premiered in September 2012; however, Ramos would no longer be a regular but had a guest-starring billing as her character went to college. In the Season 5 finale, aired in April 2014, Haddie came home for the summer, bringing along a girlfriend from college. Entertainment Weekly wrote that her performance was "one of the most underrated, sustained performances on TV recently, calling upon her to express an array of moods and emotions that went well beyond the usual prime-time network-drama teen role." She returned in Season 6 for two episodes, including the series finale.

In 2011, she voiced a character for an episode of Family Guy. In May 2011, it was announced she had joined the cast of the film Predisposed starring Jesse Eisenberg and Melissa Leo.

In 2011, she also co-wrote and co-directed a short film, The Arm, that won a Special Jury Prize for Comedic Storytelling at the Sundance Film Festival in 2012. She also directed a music video starring most of her Parenthood co-stars to the cover of "Girl on TV" sung by Landon Pigg and a short Marry Me for the Ally Coalition.

Ramos makes a brief appearance in the feature film The Perks of Being a Wallflower which has a cast that includes her Parenthood co-star Mae Whitman.

Sarah wrote, directed and starred in the short film Fluffy (2016), produced by B. B. Dakota.

In 2020, Sarah and the THNK 1994 Museum published the iconic "Autograph Hound" Exhibition Book, documenting years of Sarah's celebrity encounters and sightings, following her from a starstruck young girl to a star in her own right (who still appreciates a fabulous celebrity spotting in the wild).

In 2020, Sarah Ramos participated in Acting for a Cause, a live classic play and screenplay reading series created, directed and produced by Brando Crawford. Ramos played Lady Bracknell in The Importance of Being Earnest'' by Oscar Wilde. The reading raised funds for non-profit charities including Mount Sinai Medical Center.

Personal life
In July 2016, Ramos announced via social media that she is in a relationship with director Matt Spicer, who she has been dating since 2013. Ramos announced that she and Spicer were engaged in an Instagram post on July 30, 2019. In December 2020, Ramos announced via Instagram that she and Spicer married October 25, 2020.

Filmography

Film

Television

Director

Awards and nominations

References

External links
 
 Sarah Ramos on Instagram

21st-century American actresses
American actresses of Filipino descent
American television actresses
American child actresses
Jewish American actresses
Actresses from Los Angeles
1991 births
Living people
Columbia University alumni
21st-century American Jews